I Can Feel You Forgetting Me is the fourth studio album by American rock band, Neon Trees. It was released on July 24, 2020. This marks the group’s first album release since 2014. This is also their only album to not be released on CD. This is also their first album to have the explicit content label on the cover.

Background
The band released the lead single, "Used to Like" on November 13, 2019. The song peaked at number four on the US Alternative Airplay chart and number 17 on the US Rock Songs chart. The second single, "New Best Friend" was released on May 20, 2020. The song peaked at number 33 on the US Alternative Airplay chart. On July 10, 2020, the band released the third single called "Mess Me Up". The fourth and final single, "Nights", was released on July 22, 2020.

Singer Tyler Glenn stated that they started making the album in 2018. The band wrote around 40 songs for the album then narrowed it down to ten songs. Glenn also stated that the album "sounds like one full night of reflection, alone at the bar, walking past the places you’d go with them, texting them when you shouldn’t, and ultimately embracing the idea that no one else can complete you."

Critical reception
Luke Wells of Soundigest called the album a departure from the band's "poppy tone" that made them famous in the early 2010s. He wrote that the production is glossy and that it has 1980s vibes. He wrote that the track, "Nights", "lays out the recurring theme of extensive reflection and struggles faced in transitioning your life out of a long-term relationship". He called "Everything Is Killing Me", "the strongest song on the album" because it is about the struggles from the use of substances that are faced during a breakup.

Track listing

Personnel
 Mike Green – producer , writer 
 Nico Stadi – producer 
 Niko Hartikainen – writer 
 Tyler Glenn – writer
 Chris Gehringer – masterer 
 Neal Avron – mixer 
 Dave Bassett – producer , writer 
 Micah Gordon – producer , writer 
 Cameron Hale – producer , writer 
 Joe Janiak – producer , writer

Charts

Release history

References

2020 albums
Neon Trees albums